"La plus belle pour aller danser" (Translation: The most beautiful to dance with) is a song by Sylvie Vartan from the 1964 French feature film Cherchez l'idole.

Background and writing 
The song was written by Charles Aznavour and Georges Garvarentz.

Commercial performance 
The song spent 11 weeks at no. 1 in France.

In Wallonia (Belgium) the single spent 24 weeks in the chart, peaking at no. 3.

The song also reached no. 1 in Japan.

Track listings 
7-inch EP RCA 86046 (March 1964, France, Spain, Portugal, etc.)
A1. "La plus belle pour aller danser" (2:29)
A2. "Un air de fête" (2:13)
B1. "Dum di la" (1:54)
B2. "Ne l'imite pas" (2:48)

7-inch single RCA Victor 49.067 (1970, France)
 "La plus belle pour aller danser"
 "Si je chante"

7-inch single "Aidoru o Sagase / Koi no Shokku" RCA Victor SS-1476 (1964, Japan)
A.  ("La Plus Belle Pour Aller Danser") (2:28)
B.  ("Si Je Chante")

7-inch single "Aidoru o Sagase / Watashi o Aishite" RCA SS-2018 (1972, Japan)
A.  ("La Plus Belle Pour Aller Danser") (2:28)
B.  ("Car Tu T'en Vas")

Charts

Cover versions 
The song has been covered, among others, by Pompilia Stoian (Romania), Thanh Lan (Vietnam), Michèle Richard (Canada), Chris Garneau, Sarah Dagenais-Hakim and Emilie-Claire Barlow on her Juno Award winning album Seule ce soir.

See also 
 List of number-one singles of 1964 (France)

References

External links 
 
 Sylvie Vartan – "La plus belle pour aller danser" (EP) at Discogs
 Sylvie Vartan – "Aidoru o Sagase" (single, Japan) at Discogs
 Sylvie Vartan – La plus belle pour aller danser" (single) at Discogs
 Sylvie Vartan – "Aidoru o Sagase" (single, Japan) at Discogs

Songs about dancing
1964 songs
1964 singles
1964 EPs
French songs
Sylvie Vartan songs
RCA Victor singles
Songs written by Charles Aznavour
Songs with music by Georges Garvarentz
Number-one singles in France
Number-one singles in Japan